Kibuye Power Plant 1, also Kibuye Thermal Power Station 1 (KP1), is a  methane gas-fired thermal power plant in Rwanda.

Location

Overview
Starting in 2006, with partial financing from the International Finance Corporation (IFC), the government of Rwanda began sourcing for qualified engineering firms to design, build and operate a methane gas-powered electricity generating power plant, using gas extracted from the depths of Lake Kivu. One of the objectives of this project, was to prove that it was possible to generate electricity from methane gas in the lake in on a profitable commercial basis. The project cost an estimated US$20 million to set up.

Ownership
The project is majority owned by the Rwandan government. A partnership with Dane Associates, an Edinburgh-based enterprise broke up over financial disagreements. In 2015, with the project unable to pay its debts, the Rwanda Commercial High Court dissolved the Kibuye Power 1 Company, at the request of the government of Rwanda. The government began to accept bids from new investors to restart the project.

In October 2016, Symbion Power, an American electricity-generating enterprise, acquired Kibuye Power Plant 1 at an undisclosed sum of money. Symbion plans a gradual, phased upgrade of capacity, first to 25 MW in 2018, and to 50 MW in 2019.

Other considerations
Kibuye Power Plant 1  is the second power project Symbion has committed to develop on Lake Kivu. Under that agreement, the first  are expected in 2018.

See also

References

External links
 Symbion Power Acquires Existing KP1 Power Plant On Lake Kivu, Increasing Investment Level To US$330 Million
 Lake Kivu’s Great Gas Gamble

2008 establishments in Rwanda
Natural gas-fired power stations in Rwanda
Energy infrastructure completed in 2008